Our Land of Peace (Spanish:Nuestra tierra de paz) is a 1939 Argentine-Spanish biographical film directed by Arturo S. Mom. The film premiered in Buenos Aires and starred Warly Ceriani.

Cast
 Warly Ceriani
 Pedro Tocci 
 Elsa Martinez 
 Emperatriz Carvajal
 Salvador Arcella 
 Francisco Audenino 
 Pedro Bibe 
 Fernando Campos 
 Dario Cossier 
 José De Angelis 
 Miguel Frontaura 
 Henri Martinent 
 Héctor Méndez 
 Manuel Ochoa 
 Juan José Piñeiro
 Ángel Prio
 Enrique Vico Carré

Synopsis
The film is a biography of General José de San Martín (1778-1850) an Argentine general and central figure of the Independence of Argentina, Chile and Peru.

External links

1939 films
1930s historical films
Argentine historical films
Spanish historical films
1930s Spanish-language films
Argentine black-and-white films
Argentine biographical films
Films directed by Arturo S. Mom
Films set in South America
Films set in the 19th century
Films scored by Alejandro Gutiérrez del Barrio
Spanish black-and-white films
Spanish biographical films
1930s Argentine films